"Kream" is a song recorded by Australian rapper Iggy Azalea featuring American rapper Tyga. The song was released on 6 July 2018 by Island Records and serves as the lead single for her extended play Survive the Summer. It was written by Azalea, Tyga, and Ronny J. Production was handled by Ronny J, GT, and Wallis Lane. The song samples Wu Tang Clan's "C.R.E.A.M." and Raw Beat Mafia's "Dead End". The song passed 100 million streams on Spotify in February 2020, becoming Azalea's most recent song to do that since 2014's "No Mediocre" with T.I.

Background and release

In early July 2018, Azalea tweeted "Since I cant seem to speak about anything without being asked - when is the EP dropping" and "S.T.S is dropping 6 July. #TheMoreYouKnow". The song was originally for an album titled Digital Distortion, but the album was eventually scrapped. Furthermore, the song was delayed after Island Records appointed Darcus Beese as president of the label in May 2018. Teasers of the music video featured Iggy Azalea and Tyga during the filming process before release.

The song was released alongside a promotional single titled "Tokyo Snow Trip" on 6 July, the same day as the scheduled release of Azalea's EP Survive the Summer.

On 12 July 2018, Azalea took to her Twitter account to say after the success of "Kream", her label, Island Records decided to send the song to impact radio. The song was originally meant to just act as a promotional single before it went viral across the Internet, helping jump start Azalea's new era.

Almost exactly a year later, the song saw a mild resurgence as a snippet of the song became part of an internet challenge called Open Up The Safe Challenge (a play on the opening lyrics of the song)

In July 2019, a TikTok user, Johnny McKay, had uploaded a clip where the song was accidentally played instead of the US national anthem at a baseball game. The video quickly became an internet meme and subsequently went viral, causing the song to regain popularity. Later that month, the TikTok user claimed that the incident was all just fake.

Composition
"Kream" is a spare, slow-bounce track with mentions of Sex Pistols band member Sid Vicious, Ice Cube and model Bella Hadid, referencing her viral "homeboy" interview, with "Keep that energy, gon' up that Hennessy (ass)/I need my bag quickly/Separate six-degrees, bitches said they know me/ Sex pistols, Sid Vicious, wet you when it's horny/Hit me on my Cash App, check it in the morning" [..] "And it's perfect timing, dream with the tanny/ Bella Hadid, homie could get it".

Kream contains an interpolation from the Wu Tang Clan's "C.R.E.A.M.", written by GZA, Ghostface Killah, U God, Ol' Dirty Bastard, RZA, Inspectah Deck, Method Man and Raekwon and also from Raw Beat Mafia's "Dead End", written by Nima Jahanbin, Paimon Jahanbin, Isaac Hayes and David Porter. The song's title is an acronym that comes from the line "cash rules everything around me".

Music video
The music video, directed by Colin Tilley and filmed in Los Angeles, California, shows many women, including Azalea, twerking in a dark house with neon lighting. After a brief potential legal issue regarding the music video, which Azalea dubbed "Ovengate" on Twitter, the music video was released at 7 pm EST on 6 July 2018.  As of February 2020, the music video for "Kream" had surpassed 215 million views making it Azalea's seventh video to achieve this milestone. Azalea twerks in the video and wears a revealing leotard and fishnet. Azalea twerks near an oven with money inside of it and writhes in bed with Tyga. The music video has a stripper theme to it.

Chart performance
The song debuted at number 96 on the Billboard Hot 100 and number 41 on the Billboard Digital Song Sales charts each dated 21 July 2018, respectively. It became Azalea's  first entry on the Hot 100 since her 2016 top 50 hit "Team". It was certified Platinum by the Recording Industry Association of America (RIAA) in February 2019. Outside the US the song peaked at number 26 in Hungary, number 54 in Canada and number 96 in Ireland.

Credits and personnel
Credits adapted from Tidal.
 Iggy Azalea – vocals
 Tyga – vocals
 Ronny J – production
 GT – co-production
 Wallis Lane – production
 Christian "CQ" Quinonez – engineering
 Mike Seaberg – mixing assistance
 Rashawn Mclean – mixing assistance
 Jacob Richards – mixing assistance
 Jaycen Joshua – mixing

Charts

Certifications

Release history

References

2018 songs
2018 singles
Iggy Azalea songs
Island Records singles
Music videos directed by Colin Tilley
Songs written by Iggy Azalea
Songs written by Isaac Hayes
Songs written by Ronny J
Songs written by David Porter (musician)
Songs written by RZA
Songs written by Tyga
Songs written by Ghostface Killah
Song recordings produced by Ronny J